Viscount ; was a Japanese samurai of the late Edo period who served as daimyō of the Fuchū domain in Hitachi Province. Succeeding his father in 1869, he became the last daimyō of Fuchū. It was during his tenure that the domain's name was changed to Ishioka-han (石岡藩). In 1884, he became a viscount (子爵 shishaku).

External links
Fuchu-han genealogy

1848 births
1887 deaths
Daimyo
Kazoku
Meiji Restoration
Mitorenshi-Matsudaira clan